Oleksandr Bryl is a Ukrainian football player.

Career
Oleksandr Bryl is started his career in 2005 with Metalurh-2 Zaporizhzhia. In 2009 he moved to Feniks-Illichovets Kalinine until 2010 for one season.In 2010 he moved to Desna Chernihiv until 2013, with the club of Chernihiv he won the * Ukrainian Second League in the season 2012–13. In 2015 he moved to Inhulets Petrove.In 2015 he moved to Tavria-Skif Rozdol and in 2017 he moved to Peremoha Dnipro.

Honours
Peremoha Dnipro
 Ukrainian Football Amateur League: 2019–20

Desna Chernihiv
 Ukrainian Second League: 2012–13

References

External links 
 Oleksandr Bryl footballfacts.ru
 Oleksandr Bryl allplayers.in.ua

1988 births
Living people
FC Desna Chernihiv players
FC Metalurh-2 Zaporizhzhia players
FC Inhulets Petrove players
FC Feniks-Illichovets Kalinine players
FC Tavria-Skif Rozdol players
FC Peremoha Dnipro players
Ukrainian footballers
Ukrainian Premier League players
Ukrainian First League players
Ukrainian Second League players
Association football midfielders